Return of the Killer Tomatoes! is a 1988 American parody film directed by John De Bello. The first sequel to the 1978 film Attack of the Killer Tomatoes, the film stars Anthony Starke, Karen Mistal, and John Astin, as well as George Clooney in an early role. The film has developed a cult following and has been described as a cult classic.

Plot

Set ten years after the events of Attack of the Killer Tomatoes (referred to as the "Great Tomato War"), the United States is once again safe, and tomatoes have been outlawed (although authorities still deal with "tomato smugglers" who sell to people who cannot live without ordinary tomatoes). Wilbur Finletter (Steve Peace) has been praised as a hero of the Great Tomato War and parlayed his fame into opening Finletter's Pizzeria, which serves tomato-less pizzas. Working for Wilbur is his nephew Chad Finletter (Anthony Starke) who is a delivery boy. Also with Chad is his roommate Matt Stevens (George Clooney), a suave ladies' man.

However, trouble returns with the misanthropic mad-scientist responsible for the Tomato War, Professor Mortimer Gangreen (played by John Astin) and his assistant Igor (Steve Lundquist) seek to unleash another wave of tomato terror. Professor Gangreen was perplexed at being defeated by "Puberty Love", the worst song ever created, and says that this time music will aid, rather than hinder him. Gangreen has created a tomato transformation chamber by which he can turn ordinary tomatoes into replicas of men and women. By dipping ordinary tomatoes into vats of toxic waste and then placing them into the chamber, Gangreen uses music to his advantage, as the juke box that is hooked up to the chamber syncs up with the tomato transformation chamber, allowing him to create virtually anything by the use of whatever song he has picked (Michael Jackson music seems to make tomatoes into a clone of Jackson, the Miami Vice theme seems to make replicas of Don Johnson and seductive music apparently turns tomatoes into beautiful women). Gangreen's preferred music is rock, which creates soldiers. With his tomato commandos, Professor Gangreen seeks to attack the nearby prison where he will break out his imprisoned ally Jim Richardson (Rick Rockwell), then take over the United States under the subjugation of his killer tomatoes and installing Richardson as President of the United States. Gangreen has also used his device to create an attractive female replica named Tara (Karen Mistal), who serves Gangreen until she realizes his abusive attitude towards a wrongly mutated tomato whom she dubs FT, or Fuzzy Tomato. Tara defects to Finletter's Pizza where she starts dating Chad.

The quirky plot line partially breaks the "fourth wall" as the characters relate to the audience that the production has run out of money. Matt suggests "product placement" – at that time an emerging practice in film and television – as a solution for the financial problems. From that point forward, the film's characters comically showcase and promote various products as the film's plot line continues. Prior to this, characters were shown handling nondescript items, such as a white can marked "BEER".

Chad and Tara have a date, which goes sour when they get in an argument about the Tomato War. While Chad excuses himself, a strolling violinist plays a tune for Tara, which transforms her into a tomato and causing everyone to flee. The chimes of a grandfather clock return her to human form, then Chad returns and apologizes for his brusqueness.

Tara continues to protect FT while living with Chad (and Matt). Chad notices the garbage truck Igor is driving while Igor tries to find Tara and follows it to the dump (where Igor picks up more toxic waste) and back to Dr. Gangreen's house where Chad watches as they transform a tomato into a person.

Going home Chad finds Tara consuming plant food—they both scream and she runs away, only to be kidnapped by Igor and returned to Dr. Gangreen. Chad grabs a tomato from a smuggler; belieiving it to be Tara. He and Matt use Dr. Gangreen's equipment to restore the woman he loves. They find the machine can create a wide range of people depending on the music used, including more beautiful women (of great interest to Matt) but they do not get Tara back. They are captured by Dr. Gangreen who squishes the tomato and has Igor throw Chad and Matt into the dungeon.

There they find Tara undamaged and in human form and she and Chad reconcile. Outside the locked door they hear FT, to whom they pass a message that FT is to deliver to Wilbur who gathers the team of heroes from the first movie to rescue the captives. But while they are en route Dr. Gangreen forces Chad and Matt into the transformation chamber and starts a countdown that at the end will transform the two into tomatoes. He and Igor then leave with a captive Tara to raid the prison and start Dr. Gangreen's plan for world domination but Wilbur and his team rescue them just in time (with help of a sports joke calling for a "time out" in the film).

At the prison Dr. Gangreene transforms a bag of tomatoes into a massively-muscled and well-armed assault team and they storm the prison. While fighting Tara breaks away and Gangreen and Igor chase her, who are in turn chased by Chad, Matt, Wilbur and the others. They find Gangreen and Igor have imprisoned Tara in a gas chamber and threaten to gas her if the pursuers do not surrender. Also Igor has a hand grenade. In the ensuing fight FT throws himself on the live hand grenade before it explodes and Gangreen successfully triggers the gas. As the fumes envelope Tara behind the door she and Chad have a tearful farewell and it appears Tara is finished. Matt presses a button to clear the gas from the chamber.

A distraught Chad opens the door to find an unharmed Tara; she isn't human so the gas didn't hurt her. Dr. Gangreen triumphantly plays music to transform Tara back into a tomato but nothing happens; exposure to the gas has made Tara permanently human. The town celebrates, where FT is the guest of honor (along with heavy marketing for FT-related merchandise). Chad and Tara ride off into the sunset with the blessing of Wilbur, who asks where is Matt. He is told that Matt was ordered to dismantle Dr. Gangreen's transformation machine to Wilbur's satisfaction. The film ends with Matt on the beach, holding a tomato and surrounded by several buxom bathing beauties. 

As the credits roll, the director's mother angrily orders the audience back in their seats, saying her son worked hard on this film and they will give the crew their due. A post-credits scene shows mutated carrot soldiers with rifles, having killed two humans.

Cast
 Anthony Starke as Chad Finletter
 George Clooney as Matt Stevens
 Karen Mistal as Tara Boumdeay
 Steve Lundquist as Igor
 John Astin as Professor Mortimer Gangreen
 J. Stephen Peace as Wilbur Finletter
 Michael Villani as Bob Downs
 Frank Davis as Sam Smith
 Harvey Weber as Sid
 Charlie Jones as the Sportscaster
 John De Bello as Charles White
 Ian Hutton as Greg Colburn
 Rick Rockwell as Jim Richardson/Tomato Dealer

Future US congressman Gary Condit also had an uncredited and unspoken role in the film.  Rick Rockwell, who played Jim Richardson, later would appear on the TV show Who Wants to Marry a Multi-millionaire?.

Production

Filming

Principal photography for the film occurred in the South Bay of San Diego County.

Poster

The art for the poster, shown above, was created by then illustrator now portrait painter, David R. Darrow, now living in San Jose, CA. The original design as assigned by designer Kevin Eaton and completed by Darrow, used the design of a Campbell's Soup can, using the face of actor John Astin in the center seal. The idea was sidelined over copyright / branding concerns, and a "patch" was created to alter the work. High-end digital compositing was too expensive at the time, so Darrow was further commissioned to create the new replacement label which was physically glued over the original illustration, preserving the original background and tomato characters. Darrow still retains the original, 2-layer artwork.

Reception
According to IMDb it grossed $5 million in U.S. sales.

On Rotten Tomatoes, the film holds a rare score of 0% from 6 reviews, which means there are no favorable reviews. TV Guide described the film as being an "unnecessary sequel", and Emanuel Levy gave the film a rating of 2 out of 5, although some reviews were more favorable.

JoBlo.com reviewer Jason Adams wrote, "The zany, self-referential style lends itself to an unending stream of gags, and overall more jokes work than don't." VultureHound's Lee Hazell wrote that "Return of the Killer Tomatoes has everything a comedy like this needs. An irreverent attitude towards filmmaking conventions, genre expectations and downright decency. The manic energy of the Marx Brothers. The wilfully gleeful stupidity of the Zucker films. The playfulness of Mel Brooks. The only thing they don’t have is action scenes with murderous tomatoes. For some reason, the plot dictates that they all get turned into Chippendales with machine guns. So that takes off a point." DVD Talk reviewer Adam Tyner wrote, "Its hyper-meta sense of humor was years (maybe approaching decades) before its time. Return of the Killer Tomatoes doesn't just break the fourth wall; it grinds it into a fine powder, mixes it with some hardwood mulch, and lets all manner of comedy and humor blossom from there".

Chris Coffel, writing for Bloody Disgusting, in review of the Blu-ray edition of the film, wrote, "Return of the Killer Tomatoes has so many great jokes and little tidbits that you can’t possibly catch them in one viewing. It’s similar to The Simpsons in not only the level of humor it provides but that it’s a movie made for the VHS generation." Anthony Arrigo, reviewing the same edition for Dread Central, called the film a "zany riot. [...] Think the output of Zucker/Abrams back in their heyday, add a dose of Mel Brooks’ humor, and that's the direction for this sequel to the equally absurd Attack of the Killer Tomatoes (1978). One liners and sight gags fly with such frequency that it's almost impossible to hear and see every joke the first time around. [...] few films have ever taken comedy this meta. The actors don't break the fourth wall; the film itself breaks it!"

References

External links

 

1988 films
1980s comedy horror films
American comedy horror films
American satirical films
American sequel films
Attack of the Killer Tomatoes
Films about food and drink
New World Pictures films
1980s parody films
Parodies of horror
1980s satirical films
1988 comedy films
1980s English-language films
1980s American films
Films shot in San Diego